The grey-backed sparrow-lark (Eremopterix verticalis) or grey-backed finch-lark is a species of lark in the family Alaudidae. It is found in southern and south-central Africa. Its natural habitats are subtropical or tropical dry shrubland and subtropical or tropical dry lowland grassland. Sometimes, the name 'grey-backed sparrow-lark' is also used to describe the black-eared sparrow-lark.

Taxonomy and systematics

Subspecies 
Four subspecies are recognized:
 E. v. khama - Irwin, 1957: Found in north-eastern Botswana, western Zimbabwe and western Zambia
 E. v. harti - Benson & Irwin, 1965: Found in south-western Zambia
 E. v. damarensis - Roberts, 1931: Found from western Angola and south-western Zambia to western South Africa
 E. v. verticalis - (Smith, 1836): Found from south-eastern Botswana and south-western Zimbabwe to southern South Africa

References

External links

 Species text in The Atlas of Southern African Birds

grey-backed sparrow-lark
Birds of Southern Africa
grey-backed sparrow-lark
Taxonomy articles created by Polbot